Andrey (Andrei) Ivanovich Yeryomenko (or Yeremenko, Eremenko; ; Ukrainian: Андрій Іванович Єрьоменко; November 19, 1970) was a Soviet general during World War II and Marshal of the Soviet Union. During the war, Yeryomenko commanded the Southeastern Front (later renamed the Stalingrad Front) during the Battle of Stalingrad in summer 1942 and planned the successful defense of the city. He later commanded the armies responsible for the liberation of Western Hungary and Eastern Czechoslovakia in 1945.

Military career

Draft and early service
A Ukrainian, Yeryomenko was born in Markivka in Kharkov Governorate (today in Ukraine) to a peasant family, Yeryomenko was drafted into the Imperial Army in 1913, serving on the Southwest and Romanian Fronts during World War I. He joined the Red Army in 1918, where he served in the legendary Budyonny Cavalry (First Cavalry Army). He attended the Leningrad Cavalry School and then the Frunze Military Academy, graduating in 1935. In addition to his education, he was appointed to command of a regiment of cavalry in Dec. 1929, then a division in 1937, and then the 6th Cavalry Corps in 1938.

Invasion of Eastern Poland

On Sept. 17, 1939, Yeryomenko led his 6th Cavalry Corps into eastern Poland as part of the operations agreed to between Germany and the Soviet Union under the Molotov–Ribbentrop Pact. In general, this Soviet operation was not efficiently organized. Yeryomenko (whose Corps contained light tank and other motorized elements) was forced to request an emergency airlift of fuel so as to continue his advance. Despite these difficulties, the Corps kept moving, and Yeryomenko earned the nickname "the Russian Guderian".

World War II
Yeryomenko was given command of the prestigious 1st Red Banner Far Eastern Army, deep in eastern Siberia, where he was serving at the outbreak of Operation Barbarossa on June 22, 1941.

Eight days after the invasion began, Yeryomenko was recalled to Moscow, where he was made the Acting Commander of the Soviet Western Front, two days after its original commander, General of the Army Dmitri Pavlov, was dismissed (and later convicted and executed) for incompetence. Yeryomenko was thrust into a very precarious position. The Nazi Blitzkrieg approach to warfare quickly dominated the Western Front, but Yeryomenko motivated the remaining troops, and halted the German offensive just outside Smolensk. During this vicious defensive Battle of Smolensk, Yeryomenko was wounded. Because of his injuries, he was transferred to command the newly created Bryansk Front.

In late August, Yeryomenko was ordered to launch counter-offensive operations along the Bryansk Front, primarily against Guderian's Second Panzer Group as it began to move south to trap Kirponos' Southwestern Front around Kiev. Stavka, particularly Stalin and Shaposhnikov, seemed convinced that Yeryomenko could block or distract Guderian's drive and save Kiev from encirclement. The counter-offensive failed to accomplish its objectives despite a valiant effort, leaving Bryansk Front severely weakened.

In October the Germans launched Operation Typhoon, which was an offensive aimed at capturing Moscow. Most of Yeryomenko's weakened forces (3rd, 13th and 50th Armies) were partially encircled by Oct. 8 although small units managed to escape for days or weeks following. On Oct. 13, Yeryomenko was once again wounded, this time severely. He was evacuated to a military hospital in Moscow, where he spent several weeks recovering. In January 1942, Yeryomenko was appointed commander of the 4th Shock Army, part of the Northwestern Front. During the Soviet Winter Counteroffensive, Yeryomenko's army was part of the highly successful Toropets–Kholm Offensive, which liberated Toropets and much of the surrounding region, helping to create the Rzhev Salient, which became a major battlefield over the next 15 months. On Jan. 20, 1942, Yeryomenko was again wounded, this time in one leg, when German planes bombed his headquarters. Yeryomenko refused to evacuate to a hospital until the battle surrounding him finished.

Battle of Stalingrad

Yeryomenko's performance in the winter offensives restored Stalin's confidence, and he was given command of the Southeastern Front, on Aug. 1, 1942, where he proceeded to launch powerful counterattacks against the German offensive into the Caucasus, Fall Blau. Yeryomenko and Commissar Nikita Khrushchev planned the defense of Stalingrad, rallying and re-organizing men and equipment falling back to the city from the Don River and the steppes to the west. When one of his subordinates, Gen. Anton Lopatin, doubted if his 62nd Army would be able to defend Stalingrad, Yeryomenko replaced him with Lt. Gen. Vasily Chuikov as Army commander on Sept. 11, 1942. Chuikov and the 62nd Army went on to prove themselves as the defenders of the city, confirming Yeryomenko's judgement. On Sept. 28, the Southeastern Front was renamed the Stalingrad Front.

During Operation Uranus, November 1942, Yeryomenko's forces helped to surround the German 6th Army from the south, linking up with the northern penetration at Kalach-na-Donu. German General Erich von Manstein soon attempted to counterattack the Soviet forces and break through the line to relieve the surrounded Germans. Yeryomenko successfully repelled the attack, largely with the forces of the 2nd Guards Army along their fall-back positions on the Myshkova River.

After Stalingrad

On January 1, 1943, the Stalingrad Front was renamed Southern Front. After the end of the winter offensive, in March 1943, Yeryomenko was transferred north to the Kalinin Front, which remained relatively quiet until September, when Yeryomenko launched a small, but successful offensive. In December, Yeryomenko was once again sent south, this time to take command of the Separate Coastal Army, which was put together to retake Crimea, which was accomplished with assistance from Fyodor Tolbukhin's 4th Ukrainian Front. In April, Yeryomenko once again was sent north, to command the 2nd Baltic Front. During the summer campaign, 2nd Baltic was very successful in crushing German opposition, and was able to capture Riga, helping to bottle up some 30 German divisions in Latvia. On March 26, 1945, Yeryomenko was transferred to the command of the 4th Ukrainian Front, the unit he controlled until the end of the war. Fourth Ukrainian was positioned in Eastern Hungary. Yeryomenko's subsequent offensive helped capture the rest of Hungary, and paved the way for the Soviet liberation of Czechoslovakia. His army liberated many cities and towns in Czechoslovakia, most notably Ostrava. Today, many streets in the Czech Republic bear his name.

Post-war career
After the war, Yeryomenko had three major commands: in 1945–1946, he was the Commander in Chief of the Carpathian Military District, in 1946–1952 he was the Commander in Chief of the Western Siberian Military District, and in 1953–1958 he was the Commander in Chief of the North Caucasus Military District. On March 11, 1955, Yeryomenko, along with five other noteworthy commanders, was given the rank of Marshal of the Soviet Union. He was made Inspector General for the Ministry of Defense in 1958, a largely ceremonial role that allowed him to retire that same year.

Yeryomenko died on November 19, 1970 aged 78. The urn containing his ashes is buried in the Kremlin Wall Necropolis.

Honours and awards
Soviet Union
 "Gold Star" Medal Hero of the Soviet Union (29 July 1944)
 Five Orders of Lenin (22 February 1938, 29 July 1944, 21 February 1945, 13 October 1962, 13 October 1967)
 Order of the October Revolution (22 February 1968)
 Order of the Red Banner, four times (15 June 1926, 22 February 1941, 3 November 1944, 20 June 1949)
 Order of Suvorov, 1st class, four times (23 January 1943, 16 May 1944, 23 May 1945)
 Order of Kutuzov, 1st class (22 September 1943)
 Honorary weapon with a National Emblem of the Soviet Union in gold (22 February 1968)
 Jubilee Medal "XX Years of the Workers' and Peasants' Red Army"

Foreign Awards
 Hero of the Czechoslovak Socialist Republic (28 April 1970)
 Legion of Merit, Chief Commander (USA)
 Order of Klement Gottwald
 Honorary Citizen of Volgograd (4 May 1970), Smolensk, Daugavpils  (27 July 1964) and Ostrava (Czech Republic)

Commands
Source:

References

1892 births
1970 deaths
People from Luhansk Oblast
People from Starobelsky Uyezd
Bolsheviks
Central Committee of the Communist Party of the Soviet Union candidate members
First convocation members of the Verkhovna Rada of the Ukrainian Soviet Socialist Republic
Second convocation members of the Soviet of the Union
Third convocation members of the Soviet of Nationalities
Fourth convocation members of the Soviet of the Union
Fifth convocation members of the Soviet of the Union
Sixth convocation members of the Soviet of the Union
Seventh convocation members of the Soviet of the Union
Eighth convocation members of the Soviet of the Union
Marshals of the Soviet Union
Russian military personnel of World War I
Soviet military personnel of the Russian Civil War
Soviet military personnel of World War II from Ukraine
People of the Soviet invasion of Poland
Soviet military personnel of World War II
Frunze Military Academy alumni
Heroes of the Soviet Union
Recipients of the Order of Suvorov, 1st class
Recipients of the Order of Lenin
Recipients of the Order of the Red Banner
Recipients of the Order of Kutuzov, 1st class
Chief Commanders of the Legion of Merit
Foreign recipients of the Legion of Merit
Heroes of the Czechoslovak Socialist Republic
Recipients of the Order of the White Lion
Recipients of the Czechoslovak War Cross
Recipients of the Order of the Cross of Grunwald, 2nd class
Commanders of the Virtuti Militari
Burials at the Kremlin Wall Necropolis